Carlos Sainz Cenamor (born 12 April 1962) is a Spanish rally driver. Constructors' world champions to have benefited from Sainz are Subaru, Toyota and Citroën (and ). In the 2018 season he was one of the official drivers of the Team Peugeot Total. He received the Princess of Asturias Sports Award in 2020. Sainz is currently competing in Extreme E for the Acciona | Sainz XE Team alongside teammate Laia Sanz.

Nicknamed El Matador, Sainz previously held the WRC record for most career starts until Finnish co-driver Miikka Anttila broke the record. He was also the first non-Nordic driver to win the 1000 Lakes Rally in Finland. He came close to repeating the feat at the Swedish Rally finishing second four times and third twice. Besides WRC successes, he has won the Dakar Rally (2010, 2018, 2020), the Race of Champions (1997) and the Asia-Pacific Rally Championship (1990). His co-drivers were Antonio Boto, Luís Moya, Marc Martí and Lucas Cruz.

His son, Carlos Sainz Jr., born on 1 September 1994, is also a professional racing driver, currently competing for Scuderia Ferrari in Formula One. He also has an older brother named Antonio Sainz, born on 10 December 1957, who was also a rally driver.

Early life
Sainz was born in Madrid. Before moving into motorsport, he played football and squash. As a teenager, Real Madrid gave him a trial and in squash he was the Spanish champion at the age of 16. He got his first touch of motorsport in Formula Ford while still playing squash and football. Before dedicating himself to motorsport, Sainz studied law up to the second scheduled cycle.

Rallying career

Early career (1980–1988)
Sainz began rallying in 1980.  He finished runner-up in the Spanish Rally Championship in 1986, in a Group B Renault 5 Turbo, and won it with a Ford Sierra RS Cosworth in 1987 and 1988.

Ford gave him his first World Rally championship appearances during the 1987 season.  He finished seventh in the Tour de Corse and eighth on the RAC Rally.  He remained with Ford for the following season, now co-driven by Luis Moya, who remained his regular co-driver for the next fifteen years.  He finished fifth twice, in the Tour de Corse and the Rallye Sanremo, and seventh on an icy RAC Rally.

Ford were an increasingly minor player in the World Rally Championship, with the rear-wheel-drive Sierra uncompetitive against the four-wheel-drive cars, and struggled to retain ambitious and talented young drivers such as Sainz and his teammate in 1988, Didier Auriol.  Both departed the team for 1989; Auriol to Lancia and Sainz to Toyota Team Europe, the Japanese marque's rallying arm operating in Cologne, Germany.

Toyota (1989–1992)

Despite all previous rallying Toyota Celicas having only ever looked a competitive prospect on highly specialized endurance rallies such as the Safari Rally, the new combination of Toyota and Sainz rapidly rose in competitiveness. In the 1989 season, Sainz started with four retirements but then finished on the podium in three rallies in a row. His teammate, by then two-time world champion Juha Kankkunen, also gave the Celica GT-Four ST165 its debut win at the inaugural Rally Australia. Sainz would almost certainly have won his first World Championship Rally on the final event of the season, the RAC Rally, but for mechanical failure in the final stages, which relegated him to second.

In the 1990 season, Sainz drove his GT-Four to victory at the Acropolis Rally, at the Rally New Zealand, at the 1000 Lakes Rally, as the first non-Nordic driver, and at the RAC Rally, claiming his first world drivers' title, ahead of Lancia's Didier Auriol and Kankkunen, ending the Italian marque's domination of the drivers' world championship since the advent of the Group A era of the sport in 1987.

In , Sainz narrowly failed to defend his title against a resurgent Lancia-mounted Kankkunen, his efforts capped by a dramatic roll of his Celica in Australia which left him in a neckbrace. Both Sainz and Kankkunen took five wins, the first time in the history of the WRC that two drivers had managed such a win tally during one season. Sainz led Kankkunen by one point going into the final round of the season, the RAC Rally, where Kankkunen took his third title by winning ahead of Kenneth Eriksson and Sainz. Kankkunen's and Sainz's point totals, 150 and 143, both broke the record set by Sainz a year earlier (140).

Aboard the new ST185 Toyota Celica in the 1992 season, in a year that would prove the last for the foreseeable future for Lancia, Sainz managed to score memorable victories on the Safari Rally and on his home asphalt round, the Rally Catalunya. The title fight again went down to the wire, and this time in a three-way battle; before the RAC, Sainz led Kankkunen by two points and Auriol, who had taken a record six wins during the season, by three points. Sainz's victory ahead of Ari Vatanen and Kankkunen, combined with Auriol's retirement, confirmed the title in favour of the Spaniard.

A limited number of 440 Celica GT-Four ST185s, carrying his name on a plaque in the vehicle, and with decals on the outside, were sold in the United Kingdom in 1992 in an attempt to capitalise on Sainz's two championship successes with the works team. These were the part of the 5,000 units of ST185 for WRC homologation. It is said that Sainz still keeps a Celica GT-Four given to him by Toyota, which he drives to Real Madrid games at the Santiago Bernabéu Stadium.

Lancia (1993)

Despite winning the world title Sainz left Toyota at the end of 1992, mainly because for the 1993 season the team was to be sponsored by Castrol, a rival to Sainz's personal sponsor, Repsol.  Sainz therefore moved to the private but Lancia-backed Jolly Club.  Lancia had won the manufacturers' championship for the previous six years, but the Delta was an ageing design and technical developments during the season were minor, despite assurances given to Sainz that development would continue.  The Delta therefore lost ground to newer cars, and became less and less competitive as 1993 wore on.  Sainz's only podium finish was his second place at the Acropolis Rally.  He finished second on the San Remo Rally, but he and his teammate were later disqualified for using illegal fuel.  He finished eighth in the drivers' championship, which was won by Toyota driver Juha Kankkunen.  Lancia withdrew from the sport altogether at the end of the season.

Subaru (1994–1995)
Sainz's experience, perfectionism and abilities as a development driver played a vital role in developing the then-new Impreza to the point where it could mount a sustained challenge to Toyota and Ford. Indeed, in the hands of Sainz and Colin McRae the Subarus were frequently faster than the Fords during the season. Toyota won the manufacturers' title, but the drivers' championship was only settled on the final round, with Didier Auriol winning ahead of Sainz. In the 1995 season, he won the Monte Carlo Rally, the Rally Portugal and the Rally Catalunya. At this latter event he was trailing his teammate Colin McRae until the team ordered the Scotsman to slow down and allow Sainz to win, which led to a dispute between the drivers. Nevertheless, they were tied for the lead in the drivers' world championship going into the season-ending RAC Rally. McRae won his home event 36 seconds ahead of Sainz, despite losing time with mechanical difficulties that at one stage had put him two minutes behind. Subaru secured their first manufacturers' title with a triple win as the team's second young Briton, Richard Burns, finished third. Sainz was later to join McRae at both Ford and Citroën.

Return to Ford (1996–1997)

Sainz responded by rejoining Ford for the 1996 season. He spent two seasons with the squad, aboard the Ford Escort RS Cosworth and later, the Escort World Rally Car. In 1996, he won the inaugural Rally Indonesia and with five other podium finishes to his name, he took third place in the drivers' world championship, behind Mitsubishi's Tommi Mäkinen and Subaru's McRae. In the 1997 season, he again won the Indonesian round, along with the Acropolis Rally, but again lost the title fight to Mäkinen and McRae. However, he won the Race of Champions at the end of 1997.

Return to Toyota (1998–1999)

Sainz then departed, once again, for Toyota, partnering Didier Auriol and helping to further the Corolla World Rally Car project that had been instituted in 1997, as part of the Cologne recovery from the embarrassment of exclusion from the world championship on the penultimate round of the 1995 season.

Sainz won on his first outing for them, on the 1998 season opener Monte Carlo Rally, and later in the season, added a victory in New Zealand. The seemingly terminal blow to title rival Tommi Mäkinen's chances was his retirement on the first day of the final event of the year, the Rally Great Britain, which gave the initiative to Sainz, who now only had to finish fourth in order to ensure the title. However, just 300 metres from the finish of the last stage, he too was forced to retire from the needed fourth place with a mechanical problem. As a result, both Sainz and Toyota gifted their respective titles to rivals Mäkinen and Mitsubishi Ralliart.

A subdued season followed for Sainz in 1999, although it did at least culminate in a departing manufacturers' title for Toyota, by now fostering alternative interests in Formula One. Sainz took a total of eight podiums, but no wins, and finished fifth in the drivers' standings, behind his third-placed teammate Auriol who had taken his only win of the season at the inaugural China Rally.

Second return to Ford (2000–2002)

This was the precursor of another, three-year stint with Ford, again alongside McRae, beginning with the 2000 season. He won the inaugural edition of the Cyprus round of the world championship, and finished third in the drivers' points standings.

Sainz failed to score a victory on any rally during the 2001 season, but with five podiums and four other point-scoring finishes, he managed to keep himself in the title fight throughout the very closely contested season, eventually finishing sixth in the standings, only eleven points adrift of the champion, Subaru's Richard Burns. Meanwhile, teammate McRae took three wins and led the championship before the season-ending Rally GB, where he crashed out. Ford also lost the manufacturers' title to Peugeot.

In , Sainz inherited the victory of the Rally Argentina, having provisionally finished third, by virtue of the disqualifications of the two leading Peugeots of Marcus Grönholm and Burns. This was his only win of the season, and in a close fight for the second place in the drivers' championship, behind the dominant Grönholm, Sainz finished third, one point ahead of his teammate McRae.

Citroën (2003–2005)

Sainz continued with the team in  season, and scored his final world rally victory at the 2004 Rally Argentina. During the Rally Catalonya 2004, after announcing his retirement, Sainz was considered by drivers, codrivers and directors of the official teams, as the best rally driver of history. In the championship, Sainz finished fourth, after missing out the final rally in Australia, due an accident during pre-event recce.

Despite formally retiring at the end of the 2004 season, with a possible view to moving into the World Touring Car Championship, he was to actually find himself invited back to the WRC fold on the request of Citroën, to replace the faltering Belgian driver François Duval. Although Duval was soon to reclaim his seat, Sainz's two rallies back in the Citroën impressed many, with the now 43-year-old Spaniard posting fourth and third finishing positions respectively.

Later career in rally raid
2006 saw a first participation for Sainz at the wheel of a Volkswagen in that year's Dakar Rally, sharing the cockpit with the two times winner of the Dakar Rally, Andreas Schulz. In 2007, he repeated his attempt with Volkswagen, this time with French Michel Perin, also a former winner of the raid. Following the resignation of Fernando Martin, he even ran, eventually in vain, for the vice-president position at his beloved football club Real Madrid, for which he once trained. In 2007 Sainz won the FIA Cross-Country Rally World Cup with the Volkswagen team. In 2008, he won the Central Europe Rally, which was the relocated and rescheduled Dakar Rally for that year because of a terrorist attack. In January 2009, partnering again with Perin, he led the Dakar Rally until crashing out on the 12th stage. Later in 2009 Sainz won Silk Way Rally with Volkswagen team. At the 2010 Dakar Rally, Sainz changed again co-pilot, teaming with fellow Spaniard Lucas Cruz. Sainz edged out teammate Nasser Al-Attiyah to take his maiden win in the event. In 2010 Sainz also won the Silk Way Rally for the second time.In the 2011 Dakar Rally Sainz finished third.

Sainz entered Dakar Rally 2013 in a brand-new two-wheel-drive buggy. His teammate was former Dakar-winner Nasser Al-Attiyah and the team was supported by Qatar and Red Bull. Sainz won the first stage, but faced later various problems and was finally forced to retire on the sixth stage due to an engine failure. After the retirement Sainz commented that despite the result, "it was worth coming here with this concept ...  I hope the experience will be useful for the future even if I'm not sure whether I'll come back”. However, later Sainz announced he would like to be part of Qatar Red Bull Rally Team and return to the Dakar in 2014. Sainz took part in the 2014 Dakar, but was forced to retire after a crash on stage 10.

In March 2014 it was announced that Peugeot Sport would return to Dakar in 2015 and Sainz joined Cyril Despres to race for Peugeot, driving its Peugeot 2008 DKR. In the rally he retired after a crash. In Dakar 2016 Sainz was forced to retire from the lead after the gearbox of his Peugeot broke. In 2017 Sainz also had to retire after rolling his Peugeot during the fourth stage of the rally. In 2018, Sainz took the second Dakar win of his career with Peugeot team.

After Peugeot shut down its rally raid programme, Sainz joined X-Raid to drive a Mini at the 2019 Dakar Rally. He stuck the car in a large hole on stage 3, damaging the suspension, but limped to the end of the stage and finished the event 13th.

Sainz won his third Dakar Rally in 2020, with co-driver Lucas Cruz. The duo registered four stage wins to their name, before finally winning the race with a lead of just 6 minutes and 21 seconds.

Volkswagen's WRC project
As Volkswagen Motorsport announced its WRC entry for 2013, Sainz was announced to be part of the WRC project. Volkswagen's motorsport director Kris Nissen told that he needed "10 seconds" to convince Sainz to remain part of the company's efforts in the new programme. Nissen told that the team would need Sainz for some testing of the new car. In November 2011, Sainz had the honour to drive first kilometres with the new Volkswagen Polo R WRC near Trier, Germany, when the team began testing the new car. In late 2011, Nissen also revealed he would like to see Sainz taking part in some rally with the WRC Polo before he calls time on his career. In early 2012 Sainz drove the Polo WRC in its maiden gravel test in Spain with Sébastien Ogier and in summer he tested the Polo WRC in Finland. In October Sainz re-joined his old co-driver Luis Moya to perform course car duties on the San Marino´s annual Rally Legend event with Volkswagen's new-for-2013 Polo R WRC. In December 2012 Sainz dismissed rumours he would drive a Polo WRC in some of the WRC-rallies in 2013, but stated he was available for testing, if needed.

Sainz returned to competing in 2012, as he entered a historic rally with his old co-driver Luis Moya in Spain. The pair competed in a Porsche 911 rally car and won the rally. The pair made a return to historic rallies in March 2013 by winning Rally de España Histórico with a Porsche 911.

Recognitions
 Gold Medal of the Royal Order of Sporting Merit, 21 December 1994
 Olympic Order 1997 – Awarded by Spanish Olympic Committee
 Grand Cross of the Royal Order of Sporting Merit, 30 November 2001
 Gold Medal for Sporting Merit 2001 – Awarded by Ayuntamiento de Madrid
 Medal of youth and sports and associative engagement 2008 – Awarded by the French Government
 In March 2012, Sainz was inducted into the Rally Hall of Fame along with Michèle Mouton.
 In May 2020, Carlos Sainz has been crowned The Greatest WRC Driver of all time in a poll of fans and expert journalists.
 On 16 June 2020, Princess of Asturias Awards por Sports.

Titles

WRC victories

Complete WRC results

Dakar Rally results

Dakar Rally stage wins 

NOTE:  Following the 2007 killing of French tourists in Mauritania, the Amaury Sport Organisation moved the 2008 edition to Central Europe, known as the 2008 Central Europe Rally.  As the race was legally held under Dakar regulations with Dakar entries, the rally is included as part of the Dakar lineage.

Complete Extreme E results
(key)

References

External links

Official website of Carlos Sainz 

1962 births
Living people
World Rally Champions
World Rally Championship drivers
Spanish rally drivers
Sportspeople from Madrid
Dakar Rally drivers
Dakar Rally winning drivers
Spanish male squash players
Extreme E drivers
Audi Sport drivers
Citroën Racing drivers
Toyota Gazoo Racing drivers
Peugeot Sport drivers
Nürburgring 24 Hours drivers
Spanish racing drivers
Volkswagen Motorsport drivers